Sheffield Township may refer to several places:

In Canada

 Sheffield Township, Lennox and Addington County, Ontario (a former township)

In the United States

 Sheffield Township, Tippecanoe County, Indiana
 Sheffield Township, Ashtabula County, Ohio
 Sheffield Township, Lorain County, Ohio
 Sheffield Township, Warren County, Pennsylvania

See also

Sheffield (disambiguation)

Township name disambiguation pages